V.O.Chidambaranar Park or VOC Park is a recreational park located in the South Indian city of Erode in Tamil Nadu. The park is owned and maintained by Erode Municipal Corporation. This park was built in British India period by chairman Srinivasa Mudaliar. This park was previously known as Srinivasaa Park

History
The park was constructed  in 1912 with a land spread of 25 acres, when Thanthai Periyar was the Chairman of Erode Municipal Council. The original idea of the park was developed as a part of the Drinking water project to the town. Erode Municipality built a small reservoir named as Pechiparai to store the water from River Kaveri and four tanks in the form of towers joined with a wall. And a garden has been established in its vicinity, named after the then Municipal Chairman Srinivasa Mudaliar. With the succession of Sheikh Dawood as next Municipal Chairman, he renamed the place, Peoples' Park and added a Mini-Zoo to it.

Facilities 
The park has Gardens, two lakes, fountains and walkways. A Mini Zoo recognized by the Central Zoo Authority has been established in the park during 1992. But due to improper maintenance it was closed in 2007. In 2007, Erode Municipal Corporation developed a Science Park at a cost of  13 Lakh, opposite to the main park. The Science Park developed with a scope to improve play oriented knowledge for kids, also called Children's Park. A toy train ride was available till 2007, which is not being operated now. Erode Municipal Corporation has opened an Amma Unavagam at the second gate of VOC Park.

Sports Arenas
The Park premises houses two major Arenas for hoisting sports, fairs and other cultural events.

District Sports Complex
The District Sports unit is functioning in this Sports Complex. It is commonly called as VOC Park SDAT Stadium. This Stadium is owned and maintained by the Sports Development Authority of Tamil Nadu. The district level Independence day and Republic day celebrations will happen here, in the presence of District Collector.

Municipal Grounds
There is a maidan owned and maintained by Erode Municipal Corporation named as VOC Park Municipal Grounds, which is primarily used as a Cricket Ground. It also hoists various programs like exhibitions, trade fairs, annual events like Erode Book Festival and other cultural events. A dedicated track has been established for the walkers inside the premises.

Places of Worship
There are two devotional places located inside the premises of the park
 Mahaveera Anjaneyar Temple 
 Darga of 400 years old

Notes
 Erode VOC Park Photo Collection

References 

Erode
Tourist attractions around Erode
Botanical gardens in Tamil Nadu